Francis William Tyler (December 11, 1904 – April 11, 1956) was an American bobsledder who competed in the late 1940s. Competing in two Winter Olympics, he won the gold medal in the four-man event at St. Moritz in 1948.

After the end of each bobsled run, Tyler was known for lighting up a cigarette to smoke, and was even depicted in an advertisement for Camel cigarettes in 1949.

He died of a heart attack in 1956.

References 

1936 bobsleigh four-man results
Bobsleigh four-man Olympic medalists for 1924, 1932-56, and since 1964
DatabaseOlympics.com profile
History of bobsleigh featuring Tyler

1904 births
1956 deaths
American male bobsledders
Bobsledders at the 1936 Winter Olympics
Bobsledders at the 1948 Winter Olympics
Olympic gold medalists for the United States in bobsleigh
Sportspeople from New York (state)
Medalists at the 1948 Winter Olympics